Marc-André Gadoury is a Canadian politician who served on Montreal City Council from 2009-2017, representing the district of Étienne-Desmarteau in the borough of Rosemont–La Petite-Patrie.

First elected in the 2009 municipal election as a member of Projet Montréal, he crossed the floor in August 2015 to join the Équipe Denis Coderre.

References

Montreal city councillors
Living people
21st-century Canadian politicians
Year of birth missing (living people)